Adam Hložek (born 25 July 2002) is a Czech professional footballer who plays as a forward for Bundesliga club Bayer Leverkusen and the Czech Republic national team.

Club career

Sparta Prague
Hložek was 12 years old when transferred from his hometown club Ivančice to Sparta Prague along with his older brother Daniel.   

Four years later, on 2 October 2018, he made his debut for the first team in a Czech Cup match against Slavoj Polná as a substitution, scoring the final goal in a 4–1 away win. Hložek made his league debut for Sparta Prague on 10 November 2018 in their 3–1 win at Karviná at the age of 16 years, three months and 16 days, becoming the youngest Sparta player to appear in a league match.

Hložek finished the 2020–21 Czech First League as joint top scorer, alongside Jan Kuchta with 15 goals, despite missing four months of the season due to injury. On 30 May 2021, a day after scoring four first-half goals in a 6–1 win away to Zbrojovka Brno, Hložek signed a new contract extension until 2024 with Sparta Prague. Hložek finished the 2020–21 league season with 15 goals and seven assists in 19 games.

Bayer Leverkusen
On 2 June 2022, the winger joined Bayer Leverkusen in Germany, signing a five-year contract.

International career
Hložek made his Czech Republic national team debut on 4 September 2020 in a UEFA Nations League game against Slovakia. In May 2021, Hložek was called up by the Czech Republic for their UEFA Euro 2020 campaign. He scored his first international goal in October 2021, in the 2–0 World Cup qualification win against Belarus.

Career statistics

Club

International 

Scores and results list the Czech Republic's goal tally first, score column indicates score after each Hložek goal.

Honours
Individual
 Czech Talent of the Year: 2019
Czech First League Top Goalscorer: 2020–21 
Czech First League Forward of the Year: 2020–21
Czech First League Player of the Month: September 2020, May 2021

References

External links 
 
 
 Adam Hložek at AC Sparta Prague

Living people
2002 births
People from Ivančice
Sportspeople from the South Moravian Region
Czech footballers
Association football forwards
Czech Republic international footballers
Czech Republic under-21 international footballers
Czech Republic youth international footballers
UEFA Euro 2020 players
Czech First League players
Bundesliga players
AC Sparta Prague players
Bayer 04 Leverkusen players
Czech expatriate footballers
Czech expatriate sportspeople in Germany
Expatriate footballers in Germany